Him Chhem  (1937/1938 – May 16, 2020) was a Cambodian politician. He belonged to the Cambodian People's Party and was elected to represent Svay Rieng Province in the National Assembly of Cambodia in 2003. In 2016, he was appointed Minister of Cults and Religion.

He died on May 16, 2020.

References

Members of the National Assembly (Cambodia)
1930s births
2020 deaths
Year of birth missing
Cambodian People's Party politicians
Government ministers of Cambodia